Uvilla (Spanish, "little grape") is a name that has been used for a number of different plants:
Coccoloba costata
Physalis peruviana
Pourouma cecropiifolia
Ribes magellanicum

It can also refer to the following places:
La Uvilla, Dominican Republic
La Uvilla, Honduras
Uvilla, West Virginia